On August 8, 2004, a tour bus belonging to the Dave Matthews Band dumped an estimated  of human waste from the bus's blackwater tank through the Kinzie Street Bridge in Chicago onto the passenger sightseeing boat Chicago's Little Lady sailing in the Chicago River below.

As part of a legal settlement, the band agreed to pay $200,000 to environmental protection and other projects. The band also donated $100,000 to two groups that protect the river and the surrounding area. The band's bus driver, Stefan Wohl, pleaded guilty to dumping the waste in April 2005.

Background

The Dave Matthews Band had booked rooms at the Peninsula Hotel of 108 E. Superior Street for a two-night show at Alpine Valley Music Theatre in East Troy, Wisconsin. The incident occurred between the first and second night of the concert. The band booked five buses for its show; Stefan Wohl drove the bus of the band's violinist Boyd Tinsley.

During warm months, the Chicago Architecture Center offers a boat tour of the buildings along the Chicago River. The boats have open-roof seating, where passengers sit during the tour.

Most Chicago bridges feature riveted grating, which is used for its strength and anti-slip properties. Riveted grating allows rain, snow, and other liquids to pass through, removing the need for complicated drainage systems, to salt the bridge deck during snow, and assuring it does not ice over in wintry weather.

Incident
On Sunday, August 8, 2004, at 1:18 p.m., Wohl was alone in Tinsley's bus and driving to a downtown hotel when he emptied the bus' blackwater tank as it crossed the metal grates of the Kinzie Street bridge.

Passenger boat Chicago's Little Lady was hosting the 1 p.m. Chicago Architecture Foundation tour of the Chicago River. While passing under the bridge, the boat received the full contents of the tank on the seats of its open-roof terrace. Roughly two-thirds of the 120 passengers aboard the tour boat were soaked. The boat immediately returned to its dock, where all passengers were issued refunds. Five passengers went to Northwestern Memorial Hospital for testing. According to the Illinois Attorney General, passengers aboard included persons with disabilities, elderly, a pregnant woman, a small child, and an infant. The filing describes the incident:

The boat's deck was swabbed by its crew, and service was resumed for its scheduled 3 p.m. tour.

Aftermath
Immediately following the incident, the Chicago Police Department said they were investigating the incident but did not yet consider it a crime. On August 9, the Chicago Architecture Foundation released a statement that a witness had recorded license plate information, which they had turned over to the police as evidence. On August 10, bus driver Jerry Fitzpatrick, who drove for the band, was identified as the owner of the bus's license plate. In a phone interview, Fitzpatrick denied to a Chicago Tribune reporter that he had dumped the waste, asserting that he was parked in front of the band's hotel at the time. A publicist for the Dave Matthews Band issued a statement saying the band's management had determined that every one of its buses was parked at the time of the incident.

Fitzpatrick, who was in Effingham, Illinois, at the time, instructed Sgt. Paul Gardner of the Effingham Police Department to inspect the bus's septic tank to prove that he could not have emptied it. Gardner reported to the Chicago Tribune over Fitzpatrick's cell phone that he had inspected the tank, and that it was nearly full.

State prosecutors worked with a nearby fitness gym, the East Bank Club, to identify the offending bus based on the gym's security videotapes. On August 24, Illinois Attorney General Lisa Madigan filed a $70,000 lawsuit against Wohl, alleging that he was responsible for the dumping. Wohl denied dumping the waste, and was supported by the band. On August 25, Mayor Richard M. Daley held a press conference in which he released the videotape used as evidence. Daley expressed his belief that the dumping was "absolutely unacceptable", but that he believed the Dave Matthews Band to be "a very good band".

In March 2005, Wohl pleaded guilty to reckless conduct and discharging contaminants to cause water pollution. The Dave Matthews Band did not immediately apologize for previously supporting Wohl. He was sentenced to 150 hours of community service, fined $10,000 to be paid to Friends of the Chicago River, an environmental organization, and received 18 months probation. The Dave Matthews Band donated $50,000 to the Chicago Park District, $50,000 to Friends of the Chicago River, and paid the State of Illinois $200,000 in settlement. The Dave Matthews Band agreed to keep a log of when and where its buses empty their septic tanks.

It is believed that Wohl did not realize that there was a boat underneath the bridge when he dumped the waste. No passengers suffered any long-lasting physical health effects from having the waste dumped on them.

References

August 2004 events in the United States
Events in Chicago
Chicago River incident
2000s in Chicago
2004 in Illinois
Waste disposal incidents in the United States
Water pollution in the United States